Balgariya tarsi talant  is the Bulgarian version of the Got Talent series. It launched on bTV on 1 March 2010. Singers, dancers, comedians, variety acts, and other performers compete against each other for audience support. The winner of the show will receive 60,000 leva (about €30,000).

The first season of the show was produced by Global Films. It competed with Nova Television's Big Brother Family.

Judges and hosts

Auditions
Auditions were held in the 5 biggest cities in Bulgaria - Varna, Plovdiv, Sofia, Rousse and Bourgas.

First Season Winner
The winner of the first season was visually impaired singer Bogdana Petrova.

Second Season Winner
The winner of the second season was young singer Kristina Arabadjieva.

Third Season Winner
The winner of the third season was Bulgarian Pavarotti Thomas Tomov.

Fourth Season Winner
The winner of the fourth season was breaker cripple Plamen Lubenov.

Fifth Season Winner
The winner of the fifth season was music brass band Vivo Montana.

Sixth Season Winner
The winner of the sixth season was the blind imitator Adriyan Asenov.

References

Bulgarian reality television series
Bulgarian music television series
Got Talent
Television series by Fremantle (company)
2010s Bulgarian television series
2010 Bulgarian television series debuts
2010 Bulgarian television series endings
2012 Bulgarian television series endings
2014 Bulgarian television series endings
2015 Bulgarian television series endings
2016 Bulgarian television series endings
Bulgarian television series based on British television series
Bulgarian-language television shows
BTV (Bulgaria) original programming